Jonathan Varane (born 9 September 2001) is a French professional footballer who plays as a midfielder for Spanish club Sporting de Gijón B.

Career 
Varane is a youth product of Lens, having joined the youth academy in 2007. He signed his first professional contract with the club on 18 May 2021. He made his professional debut with Lens in a 3–2 Ligue 1 loss to Nantes on 10 December 2021, coming on as a sub in the 90+2 minute.

On 24 January 2022, Varane joined Rodez on loan until the end of the season.

On 24 August 2022, Varane signed with Sporting de Gijón B in Spain.

Personal life
Varane is of Martiniquais descent through his father. He is the half brother of the French international footballer Raphaël Varane.

References

External links
 
 
 RC Lens Footeo profile

2001 births
Living people
Footballers from Lille
French footballers
French people of Martiniquais descent
Association football midfielders
RC Lens players
Rodez AF players
Sporting de Gijón B players
Sporting de Gijón players
Ligue 1 players
Ligue 2 players
Championnat National 2 players
Tercera Federación players
French expatriate footballers
Expatriate footballers in Spain
French expatriate sportspeople in Spain